Bereznik is the name of several inhabited localities in Russia.

Arkhangelsk Oblast
As of 2010, nineteen inhabited localities in Arkhangelsk Oblast bear this name.

Urban localities
Bereznik, Vinogradovsky District, Arkhangelsk Oblast, a work settlement in Vinogradovsky District

Rural localities
Bereznik, Khavrogorsky Selsoviet, Kholmogorsky District, Arkhangelsk Oblast, a village in Khavrogorsky Selsoviet of Kholmogorsky District
Bereznik, Rakulsky Selsoviet, Kholmogorsky District, Arkhangelsk Oblast, a village in Rakulsky Selsoviet of Kholmogorsky District
Bereznik, Revazhsky Selsoviet, Kotlassky District, Arkhangelsk Oblast, a village in Revazhsky Selsoviet of Kotlassky District
Bereznik, Solvychegodsky Selsoviet, Kotlassky District, Arkhangelsk Oblast, a village in Solvychegodsky Selsoviet of Kotlassky District
Bereznik, Krasnoborsky District, Arkhangelsk Oblast, a village in Belosludsky Selsoviet of Krasnoborsky District
Bereznik, Lensky District, Arkhangelsk Oblast, a village in Kozminsky Selsoviet of Lensky District
Bereznik, Leshukonsky District, Arkhangelsk Oblast, a village in Nisogorsky Selsoviet of Leshukonsky District
Bereznik, Mezensky District, Arkhangelsk Oblast, a village in Kozmogorodsky Selsoviet of Mezensky District
Bereznik, Pinezhsky Selsoviet, Pinezhsky District, Arkhangelsk Oblast, a village in Pinezhsky Selsoviet of Pinezhsky District
Bereznik, Shotogorsky Selsoviet, Pinezhsky District, Arkhangelsk Oblast, a village in Shotogorsky Selsoviet of Pinezhsky District
Bereznik, Trufanogorsky Selsoviet, Pinezhsky District, Arkhangelsk Oblast, a village in Trufanogorsky Selsoviet of Pinezhsky District
Bereznik, Shenkursky District, Arkhangelsk Oblast, a village in Ust-Padengsky Selsoviet of Shenkursky District
Bereznik, Bereznitsky Selsoviet, Ustyansky District, Arkhangelsk Oblast, a selo in Bereznitsky Selsoviet of Ustyansky District
Bereznik, Minsky Selsoviet, Ustyansky District, Arkhangelsk Oblast, a village in Minsky Selsoviet of Ustyansky District
Bereznik, Poponavolotsky Selsoviet, Velsky District, Arkhangelsk Oblast, a village in Poponavolotsky Selsoviet of Velsky District
Bereznik, Rakulo-Kokshengsky Selsoviet, Velsky District, Arkhangelsk Oblast, a village in Rakulo-Kokshengsky Selsoviet of Velsky District
Bereznik, Shadrengsky Selsoviet, Velsky District, Arkhangelsk Oblast, a village in Shadrengsky Selsoviet of Velsky District
Bereznik, Vilegodsky District, Arkhangelsk Oblast, a village in Ilyinsky Selsoviet of Vilegodsky District

Belgorod Oblast
As of 2010, one rural locality in Belgorod Oblast bears this name:
Bereznik, Belgorod Oblast, a khutor in Prokhorovsky District

Kirov Oblast
As of 2010, five rural localities in Kirov Oblast bear this name:
Bereznik, Bereznikovsky Rural Okrug, Kumyonsky District, Kirov Oblast, a selo in Bereznikovsky Rural Okrug of Kumyonsky District
Bereznik, Kumensky Rural Okrug, Kumyonsky District, Kirov Oblast, a village in Kumensky Rural Okrug of Kumyonsky District
Bereznik, Orlovsky District, Kirov Oblast, a village in Podgorodny Rural Okrug of Orlovsky District
Bereznik, Slobodskoy District, Kirov Oblast, a village in Ozernitsky Rural Okrug of Slobodskoy District
Bereznik, Zuyevsky District, Kirov Oblast, a village in Oktyabrsky Rural Okrug of Zuyevsky District

Komi Republic
As of 2010, one rural locality in the Komi Republic bears this name:
Bereznik, Komi Republic, a village in Yb Selo Administrative Territory of Syktyvdinsky District

Kostroma Oblast
As of 2010, one rural locality in Kostroma Oblast bears this name:
Bereznik, Kostroma Oblast, a village under the administrative jurisdiction of   the town of district significance of Kologriv in Kologrivsky District

Kursk Oblast
As of 2010, one rural locality in Kursk Oblast bears this name:
Bereznik, Kursk Oblast, a settlement in Melekhinsky Selsoviet of Shchigrovsky District

Novgorod Oblast
As of 2010, three rural localities in Novgorod Oblast bear this name:
Bereznik, Borovichsky District, Novgorod Oblast, a village in Progresskoye Settlement of Borovichsky District
Bereznik, Pesotskoye Settlement, Demyansky District, Novgorod Oblast, a village in Pesotskoye Settlement of Demyansky District
Bereznik, Zhirkovskoye Settlement, Demyansky District, Novgorod Oblast, a village in Zhirkovskoye Settlement of Demyansky District

Perm Krai
As of 2010, four rural localities in Perm Krai bear this name:
Bereznik, Chusovoy, Perm Krai, a village under the administrative jurisdiction of the town of krai significance of Chusovoy
Bereznik, Beryozovsky District, Perm Krai, a village in Beryozovsky District
Bereznik, Okhansky District, Perm Krai, a village in Okhansky District
Bereznik, Permsky District, Perm Krai, a village in Permsky District

Vologda Oblast
As of 2010, eight rural localities in Vologda Oblast bear this name:
Bereznik, Antushevsky Selsoviet, Belozersky District, Vologda Oblast, a village in Antushevsky Selsoviet of Belozersky District
Bereznik, Gulinsky Selsoviet, Belozersky District, Vologda Oblast, a village in Gulinsky Selsoviet of Belozersky District
Bereznik, Ferapontovsky Selsoviet, Kirillovsky District, Vologda Oblast, a village in Ferapontovsky Selsoviet of Kirillovsky District
Bereznik, Kovarzinsky Selsoviet, Kirillovsky District, Vologda Oblast, a village in Kovarzinsky Selsoviet of Kirillovsky District
Bereznik, Sheksninsky District, Vologda Oblast, a village in Kameshnikovsky Selsoviet of Sheksninsky District
Bereznik, Tarnogsky District, Vologda Oblast, a village in Shebengsky Selsoviet of Tarnogsky District
Bereznik, Vashkinsky District, Vologda Oblast, a village in Roksomsky Selsoviet of Vashkinsky District
Bereznik, Vologodsky District, Vologda Oblast, a village in Bereznikovsky Selsoviet of Vologodsky District